Bishop of Cluj may refer to: 
The bishop of the Greek Catholic Diocese of Cluj-Gherla
The bishop of the Orthodox Archbishopric of Vad, Feleac and Cluj
The bishop of the Eparhia Reformată din Ardeal